Olusanya Temi Fadahunsi (born 29 August 1999) is an English professional footballer who plays as a forward for Torquay United on loan from League Two club Sutton United.

Club career
Originally starting his career with Watford, Fadahunsi went onto have spells with Tooting & Mitcham United where he played as a Right Back and Finnish side, PS Kemi before opting to study at Loughborough University, whilst featuring for the their first-team.

On 20 July 2022, following a successful trial period, Fadahunsi joined League Two side, Sutton United. On 13 August 2022, he made his debut for the club, making an instant impact, coming off the substitutes bench to score the winner in their 1–0 victory over Barrow. During that same month, he went onto score twice more in all competitions, netting against Mansfield Town and Chelsea U21s. In January 2023, he joined Torquay United on loan until the end of the season.

Career statistics

References

External links

1999 births
Living people
English footballers
Association football forwards
Watford F.C. players
Tooting & Mitcham United F.C. players
Kemi City F.C. players
Loughborough University F.C. players
Sutton United F.C. players
Torquay United F.C. players
Isthmian League players
English Football League players
English expatriate sportspeople in Finland
Expatriate footballers in Finland
Black British sportspeople